La Victoria, founded as Santa María de la Victoria, is a small community located in the Santo Domingo Province of the Dominican Republic.

Climate

References

Populated places in Santo Domingo Province